The black-and-cinnamon fantail (Rhipidura nigrocinnamomea) is a species of bird in the fantail family Rhipiduridae. It is endemic to the island of Mindanao in the Philippines. There are two subspecies, the nominate R. n. nigrocinnamomea, from central and southern Mindanao; and R. n. hutchinsoni in north, western and eastern Mindanao. The specific name is derived from Latin niger for 'black', and cinnamomeus for 'cinnamon'.

The nominate subspecies has a black head with a prominent white eyebrow, the back, rump and tail are cinnamon coloured, the wings are black and cinnamon, the breast is white and the belly is orange-cinnamon. The subspecies R. n. hutchinsoni  is similar to the nominate but lacks the white on the breast.

It feeds on insects. The species is not considered threatened in spite of having a small range, and is common where it occurs.

References

black-and-cinnamon fantail
Birds of Mindanao
black-and-cinnamon fantail
Taxonomy articles created by Polbot